JLA: Created Equal is a two-issue DC Elseworlds series published in 2000. It is written by Fabian Nicieza and illustrated by Kevin Maguire.

Plot summary
A cosmic storm passes through the planet Earth, bringing with it a mysterious plague which nearly kills the entire male population (an event later referred to as the Fall). The only two men who survive are Superman and his archenemy Lex Luthor. Superman was immune to the plague due to his Kryptonian DNA, and Luthor had sealed himself away from the storm's radiation in his battle armor. The Earth's leaders elect the island of Themyscira as the new capitol of the world, and it is here that the next generation of male children will be raised. Superman and Lois Lane's son, Adam Kent, is the first newborn male since the storm hit, and more are born through Superman's DNA, granting them Kryptonian powers, while others take on new responsibilities, such as Barbara Gordon being granted Kyle Rayner's Green Lantern ring. However, Superman discovers that he might be a carrier of the plague, and exiles himself from the planet to spare his son's life. Fifteen years later, Luthor manipulates the male children of Themyscira to rise up against the female leaders of the world, and Superman must return to stop him, even if it means going against his own children. Fortunately, during his exile Superman had discovered a way to inoculate others from the plague he carried, with Luthor's attempt to kill Superman with kryptonite allowing the cure to work on the Man of Steel; the cure was initially useless on Superman due to his super-immunity, but the kryptonite weakened his immune system enough for the cure to be effective. With Luthor defeated as he suffers a stroke during the final battle, Superman confirms that Luthor intended to kill the Kryptonian children once the Amazons had been defeated and replace them with Luthor's own children, which Superman and the other female heroes vow to raise properly.

See also
JLA: Act of God, another Elseworlds title based in a similar idea
Y: The Last Man, also published by DC
List of Elseworlds publications

References

External links
 
 JLA: Created Equal #2 review

Comics by Fabian Nicieza